Morenga is a 1985 West German drama film directed by Egon Günther. It is based on the 1978 novel Morenga by Uwe Timm, and was entered into the 35th Berlin International Film Festival. It is set in the aftermath of the Second Boer War.

Cast
 Ken Gampu as Jacob Morenga
 Jacques Breuer as Gottschalk
 Edwin Noel as Wenstrup
 Gideon Camm as Jakobus
 Jürgen Holtz as v. Kageneck
 Manfred Seipold as v. Koppy
 Tobias Hoesl as v. Treskow
 Harrison Coburn as v. Schwanebach
 Arnold Vosloo as v. Schiller
 Robert Whitehead as Haring
 Vernon Dobtcheff as Lohmann
 Brian O'Shaughnessy as Herr Lüdemann

References

External links

1985 films
1980s historical films
1985 television films
German historical films
West German films
1980s German-language films
Films directed by Egon Günther
Films set in the 1900s
Films set in Namibia
Films based on German novels
German television films
German-language television shows
Television shows based on German novels
Das Erste original programming
Colonialism in popular culture
1980s German films